The 1948 UC Santa Barbara Gauchos football team represented Santa Barbara College during the 1948 college football season.

Santa Barbara competed in the California Collegiate Athletic Association (CCAA). The team was led by fourth-year head coach Stan Williamson and played home games at La Playa Stadium in Santa Barbara, California. They finished the season with a record of six wins and five losses (6–5, 2–3 CCAA). At the end of the season, the Gauchos played in the first Potato Bowl, in Bakersfield, California.

Schedule

Team players in the NFL
No Santa Barbara Gaucho players were selected in the 1949 NFL Draft.

The following finished their Santa Barbara Gauchos career in 1948, were not drafted, but played in the NFL.

Notes

References

Santa Barbara
UC Santa Barbara Gauchos football seasons
Santa Barbara Gauchos football